Thai symphalangism syndrome is a novel genetic disorder which is characterized by proximal and distal symphalangism of the fingers, postaxial polydactyly, hypodontia, ear dysplasia, blepharoptosis, short stature, toe distal phalange agenesis, and frenula hyperplasia.

Etimology 
This disorder was discovered in 2003 by Kantaputra et al., who described a 12 year old Thai girl with the symptoms mentioned above.

Unlike other rare genetic syndromes with 1-5 reported cases, this disorder has a known genetic cause: mutations in the NOG and GDF5 genes. Mutations responsible for other symphalangism syndromes were not found in the girl.

References 

Genetic diseases and disorders
Rare diseases